is a 1963 Japanese samurai film directed by Kihachi Okamoto with a screenplay by Okamoto, Takeshi Sano and Shinichi Sekizawa.  The film is about a disenchanted samurai who resorts to smuggling weapons for a rival army.

Japanese cinema specialist David Desser called the film "eccentric".

Plot

Cast 
 Yūzō Kayama as Ochi
 Makoto Satō as Kinoshita Tokichiro
 Yuriko Hoshi as Sagiri
 Kumi Mizuno as Lady Taki
 Hiroshi Hasegawa as Hachisuka Koroku
 Jun Tazaki as Ariyoshi Sosuke
 Ichirō Nakatani as Doshi Harima

Release
Warring Clans was distributed by Toho in Japan on March 24, 1963. It was distributed with English-language subtitles by Toho International in the United States on July 19, 1963. An English-dubbed version was also produced.

References 
Citations

Bibliography

External links 
 
 Sengoku Yaro - Vintage Ninja

1963 films
Japanese black-and-white films
1960s Japanese-language films
Samurai films
Toho films
Films scored by Masaru Sato
Films produced by Tomoyuki Tanaka
Films with screenplays by Shinichi Sekizawa
1960s Japanese films